Lisa Ramos may refer to:

a character in Man on Fire (2004 film)
a contestant in America's Next Top Model (season 13)